Draw the Line is the debut album by rap group, Ghetto Mafia. It was released on April 26, 1994 through Ichiban Records and was produced by Sedric "Swift" Barnett and Carl "Cooly C" Dorsey. Draw the Line managed to peak at #79 on the Billboard's Top R&B/Hip-Hop Albums chart.

Track listing
"Intro"- :57  
"Life of a Sniper"- 3:52  
"Everyday Thang in da Hood"- 4:03 (Featuring MC Breed) 
"Special Delivery"- :29  
"Mr. President"- 4:52  
"Organized Crime"- 3:21  
"Draw the Line"- 4:08  
"Real Motha Fuckaz"- 4:17  
"Cost to Be the Boss"- 3:18  
"Facts of Life"- 4:25  
"A-Town"- 4:58  
"One Less Bitch"- :26  
"Downtown Glory"- 4:16

Chart history

References

External links
[ Draw the Line] at Allmusic
Draw the Line  at Tower Records
[ Draw the Line] at Billboard

1994 debut albums
Ghetto Mafia albums
Ichiban Records albums